The Order of Fiji is the highest honour of the Fijian honours system.  Established 1 March 1995, the order is presented for achievement and merit to Fiji and mankind as a whole.  The order is divided into a general division and military division, and is presented in three classes, with an associated medal.

The President of Fiji serves as the chancellor of the order and also as the order's Principal Companion.  Following their terms of office, former Presidents remain as Companions of the Order of Fiji.

The Order of Fiji has been a Commonwealth honour ever since Fiji returned to its membership of the Commonwealth in October 1997, albeit, as a republic in the Commonwealth of Nations

Grades and divisions
The Order of Fiji is awarded in a military division and a general division. It is awarded in three classes and a medal with the following post-nominal letters:

 Companion (CF)
 Officer (OF)
 Member (MF)
 Medal (MOF)

Notable recipients
 Ratu Sir Kamisese Mara
 Frank Bainimarama
 Aiyaz Sayed-Khaiyum
 Sir Paul Reeves
 Ben Ryan
 Vijay Singh

Companions

 Daniel Fatiaki
 Ratu Josefa Iloilo
 Ratu Epeli Nailatikau
 Satya Nandan
 Jai Ram Reddy
 Filipe Bole
 Chris Cracknell (rugby union)
 Iliesa Delana
 Petero Mataca
 Peter Thomson
 Murray McCully
 Sir Michael Somare
 Anthony Gates
 James Ah Koy

Officers 

 George Konrote
 Manu Korovulavula
 Hari Punja
 Taufa Vakatale
 Brij Lal
 Jeremaia Waqanisau

References

External links
 

Orders, decorations, and medals of Fiji

Awards established in 1995
1995 establishments in Fiji